Sjuhalla is a locality situated in Karlskrona Municipality, Blekinge County, Sweden with 204 inhabitants in 2010.

References 

Populated places in Karlskrona Municipality